The President of Calvin University is the chief executive officer of the school. The office is not as old as Calvin University, which had no need for such a position when it was founded in 1876. When the Theological School of the Christian Reformed Church opened in 1876, it had one instructor. As other instructors joined the staff, the title Rector was applied to the person in charge of daily affairs, while the title of docent was applied to all other faculty. When the literary curriculum was added in 1894, the head of the Literary section went by the title of Principal. The office of College President was created in 1918 to replace the office of Principal. The seminary head remained the Rector until 1931, when that title also was changed to Seminary President.

List of Presidents of Calvin University
1876–1902 Geert Boer (Docent)
1900–1918 Albertus Rooks (Principal)
1919–1925 John Hiemenga
1925–1930 Johannes Broene
1930–1933 Rienk Kuiper
1933–1939 Ralph Stob
1939–1951 Henry Schultze
1951–1976 William Spoelhof
1976–1995 Anthony J. Diekema
1995–2012 Gaylen James Byker
2012–2022 Michael K. Le Roy
2022–Present Wiebe Boer

External links
Calvin University President's Page

Calvin University
 
Calvin University
Calvin University